Kevin Lefranc (born 1 March 1986) is a French footballer who is contracted to FC Jeunesse Canach in the Luxembourg National Division. A football journeyman, Lefranc has played for 12 different clubs in 7 separate countries. He plays as a striker.

Career
Lefranc was signed by Troyes AC at the age of 14, after showing promising signs whilst playing for his youth club at CO Saint-Dizier. in 2005 he moved to the island of Majorca, Spain, where he signed with 3ª - Group 11 club CD Constancia. However, his stay was short, leaving the club after it fell into financial problems, only scoring 3 times in 15 appearances.

Lefranc then travelled to Belgium, where he signed for K.S.K. Ronse, then in the Belgian Second Division. He made his debut for the club in a game against Meerhout Once more, his stay was short only lasting 13 games for the return of 2 goals.

He then signed for 2 clubs in the space of 12-months with Royal Mouscron-Péruwelz, making 8 appearances, and US Boulogne where his contract was terminated without playing a single game.

In 2008, Lefranc moved abroad once more, this time to Cyprus, where he signed with Cypriot Third Division club ASIL Lysi. However, this was once more an unsuccessful move, as he only made 7 appearances, scoring once.

Moving back to Europe, he signed a short-term contract with FC Baulmes in the 1.Liga. He was then signed by R.E. Virton in the Belgian Third Division B, on a 2-year contract. However, he was controversially dropped from the first XI to the reserve squad half way through his contract. Lefranc claims he was only notified by text message.

Lefranc was hoping to go out on loan, to FC Bleid, however due to financial reasons, R.E.Virton refused to let him go, and at the end of the season, Lefranc moved abroad for a third time, this time out to Singapore, with professional outfit Etoile FC in the S.League, where he signed a 1-year contract.

Lefranc made his debut for the Clementi Stars in the opening round 2-0 victory over Geylang United.

Lefranc moved to French side Etoile FC in 2011 who played in the Singapore S.League where he scored 3 goals in 25 games for them. After one season he was released and then moved back to Belgium to sign for RE Bertrix in 2012. After one season at RE Bertrix he was signed by Luxembourg side SR Delémont in 2013. He was there until July 2015 when he was loaned out to FC Jeunesse Canach, then of the Luxembourg Ehrenpromotion where he scored 9 goals in 19 games and helped the team finish 3rd to earn promotion back to the Luxembourg National Division at the end of the 2015/16 season. After his loan spell finished FC Jeunesse Canach signed Lefranc on a contract until 2019.

He has French and Belgian citizenship.

References

External links
 

1986 births
Living people
People from Vitry-le-François
French footballers
Expatriate footballers in Singapore
Expatriate footballers in Cyprus
CE Constància players
ASIL Lysi players
Association football forwards
Sportspeople from Marne (department)
Cypriot Second Division players
Étoile FC players
Footballers from Grand Est
Expatriate footballers in Luxembourg
French expatriate footballers
French expatriate sportspeople in Luxembourg
French expatriate sportspeople in Cyprus
French expatriate sportspeople in Spain
French expatriate sportspeople in Singapore
French expatriate sportspeople in Belgium
Expatriate footballers in Belgium
Expatriate footballers in Spain
K.S.K. Ronse players
R.E. Virton players
Royal Excel Mouscron players
FC Progrès Niederkorn players
ES Troyes AC players